Lencăuți is a commune in Ocnița District, Moldova. It is composed of two villages, Lencăuți and Verejeni.

References

Communes of Ocnița District
Populated places on the Dniester